Judy Klauser (born c. 1940) is a retired American gymnast. She won a team gold medal at the 1959 Pan American Games, and the individual all-round AAU junior championship in 1961.

References

1941 births
Living people
American female artistic gymnasts
Pan American Games medalists in gymnastics
Pan American Games gold medalists for the United States
Gymnasts at the 1959 Pan American Games
Medalists at the 1959 Pan American Games
21st-century American women